Velichkov Knoll (‘Velichkova Mogila’ \ve-'lich-ko-va mo-'gi-la\) is the peak rising to 1006 m east of Sabine Glacier and west of Andrew Glacier on Davis Coast in Graham Land on the Antarctic Peninsula.  Situated 6.55 km east-southeast of Bankya Peak, 5.25 km northeast of Sredorek Peak and 6.3 km southwest of Nikyup Point.

The peak is named after the Bulgarian pioneer of aviation Stoyan Velichkov (1871-1966) who constructed the first air-dropped bomb ‘Velichka’ used in the First Balkan War in 1912.

Location
German-British mapping in 1996.

Map
 Trinity Peninsula. Scale 1:250000 topographic map No. 5697. Institut für Angewandte Geodäsie and British Antarctic Survey, 1996.

Notes

References
 Bulgarian Antarctic Gazetteer. Antarctic Place-names Commission. (details in Bulgarian, basic data in English)
 Velichkov Knoll. SCAR Composite Antarctic Gazetteer

External links
 Velichkov Knoll. Copernix satellite image

Mountains of Graham Land
Bulgaria and the Antarctic
Davis Coast